The Colt New Line was a single action pocket revolver introduced by the Colt's Patent Fire Arms Manufacturing Company in 1873. 

Two years after the Colt House Revolver (1871), a year after the Colt Open Top (1872) and almost simultaneously alongside the Colt Peacemaker (1873), the Colt New Line was one of the first metallic cartridge rear-loading revolvers manufactured by Colt's. It was, alongside the Colt Open Top Pocket Model Revolver (1871), one of the first pocket metallic cartridge revolvers made by the company.

History 

When the Rollin White patent for metallic cartridges firearms manufacture expired (c. 1870) the Colt's Patent Fire Arms Manufacturing Company started working on its own metallic cartridge revolvers. Thus, after having introduced its first breech-loaders in 1871 (Colt House/Cloverleaf) and 1872 (Colt Open Top), in 1873 Colt launched the Colt Peacemaker along with a new line of pocket revolvers, sorted in five different calibers. Since it was an entirely new line of revolvers this model was called the Colt New Line.

Circa 1884-1886, submerged by the competitors' cheaper imitations and refusing to introduce a lower quality among its own firearms, the Colt company dropped the line and ceased production.

Variants 

The Colt New Line was chambered and produced as follows.

 Colt New Line .22 Caliber Revolver: in production from 1873 to 1877
 Colt New Line .30 Caliber Revolver: in production from 1874 to 1876
 Colt New Line .32 Caliber Revolver: in production from 1873 to 1884
 Colt New Line .38 Caliber Revolver: in production from 1874 to 1880
 Colt New Line .41 Caliber Revolver: in production from 1874 to 1879

The .22 caliber version was equipped with a 7-shot cylinder. All other four versions of the gun had 5-round cylinders.

Specifications (.22 caliber version) 

 Production period: 1873 - 1877
 Caliber: .22 short / .22 long
 Weight: 0.44 lbs (0.2 kg)
 Barrel length: 2.2 in (56mm)
 Capacity: 7-round cylinder
 Fire Modes: Single Action
 Loading Modes: Breach loading

Specifications (.38 caliber version) 

 Production period: 1874 - 1880
 Caliber: .38 Long Colt
 Weight: 0.84 lbs (0.38 kg)
 Barrel length: 2.25 in (57 mm), 4 in (10.2 cm)
 Capacity: 5-round cylinder
 Fire Modes: Single Action
 Loading Modes: Breech-loading

See also 

 .22 Short
 .22 Long
 .32 Long Colt
 .38 Long Colt
 .41 Short Colt
 .41 Long Colt
 Colt Model 1855 Sidehammer Pocket Revolver
 Colt Pocket Percussion Revolvers

References 

Colt revolvers
Single-action revolvers